In Mandaeism, Hibil or Hibil Ziwa is an uthra (angel or guardian) from the World of Light. Hibil is considered to be the Mandaean equivalent of Abel.

Prayers in the Qolasta frequently contain the recurring formula "In the name of Hibil, Šitil, and Anuš".

Overview
According to Mandaean beliefs and scriptures including the Qolastā, the Book of John and Genzā Rabbā, Abel is cognate with the angelic soteriological figure Hibil Ziwa, (sometimes translated "Splendid Hibel"), who is spoken of as a son of Hayyi or of Manda d-Hayyi, and as a brother to Anush (Enosh) and to Sheetil (Seth), who is the son of Adam. Elsewhere, Anush is spoken of as the son of Sheetil, and Sheetil as the son of Hibil, where Hibil came to Adam and Eve as a young boy when they were still virgins, but was called their son. Hibil is an important lightworld being (uthra) who conquered the World of Darkness. As Yawar Hibil, he is one of multiple figures known as Yawar, being so named by and after his father.

In the Diwan Abatur, Hibil tells the uthra Abatur to go and reside in the boundary between the World of Light and the World of Darkness, and weigh for purity those souls which have passed through all the purgatories and wish to return to the light.

Descent to the World of Darkness
Hibil's soteriological descent to the World of Darkness and his baptisms before and after are detailed in book 5 of the Right Volume of the Ginza Rabba, and also in a separate text named Diwan Masbuta d-Hibil Ziwa ("The Scroll of the Baptism of Hibil Ziwa"). Hibil battles and defeats Krun and seals the abodes of the rulers of darkness. Some versions of this account have parallels with the Hymn of the Pearl included in the Acts of Thomas.

In response to an upset of the dualistic balance of the universe, Manda d-Hayyi summons Hibil, whom the King of Light proceeds to baptise in 360,000 or 360 yardeni. In connection with this baptism, Hibil is bestowed with 360 robes of light, the Great Mystery, seven staves, and the name Yawar, amongst other attributes.

Hibil is dispatched to the World of Darkness and enters the world of Ruha, lingering for many ages until the Great Mystery instructs him to descend further. He descends to the world of Zartai-Zartanai, remaining there undetected for many ages while aiding the beings of light accompanying him with prayers and supplications, before descending through the worlds of Hag and Mag and of Gaf and Gafan, and confronting Shdum over the disturbance in the world of light. Shdum directs Hibil further down to Giu, who directs Hibil further down to Giu's brother Krun, whom Hibil battles. Krun surrenders and hands over seals to secure Hibil's passage through the World of Darkness.

Hibil ascends, sealing the abodes of Giu and Shdum, to the world of Qin. According to the Diwan Masbuta d-Hibil Ziwa, Qin-Anatan is the consort of Gaf; according to the Right Ginza, Hibil assumes the appearance of Anathan, who is the husband of Qin. Hibil asks Qin what they are made from, and Qin shows him the murky waters, which the Great Mystery informs him is utter bitterness and the sole constant of the World of Darkness. Hibil then ascends back to the world of Gaf and Gafan. In the Diwan Masbuta d-Hibil Ziwa, Qin had also revealed the mysteries of the jewel, mirror and bitter herb (explained as supplying the strength of the World of Darkness) to Hibil in response to his questions, and he had secretly taken them, while in the Right Ginza, Hibil marries Zahreil, the daughter of Qin, while undercover in the world of Gaf and Gafan, and she shows him the spring with the mirror (said to show the past and future), which he takes. In this version, Hibil is said not to have copulated with Zahreil, since his intention was to locate the mysteries rather than to get married, although some other accounts consider Ptahil a son of Hibil and Zahreil.

Hibil disguises himself as Gaf and appears to Ruha, who is pregnant with Ur. He leads her out of the world of Gaf and Gafan, sealing its gates, seals the gates of the world of Zartai-Zartanai, commands the Great Mystery to confound Ruha, and seals her in her world. The Diwan Masbuta d-Hibil Ziwa also mentions Hibil taking away dark waters and Ptahil.

Hibil offers prayers to the King of Light, who sends for Manda d-Hayyi to send a Letter of Kushta and phial of oil to Hibil, which are received, but Hibil and his companions remain detained by the powers of darkness, until a masiqta is performed, following which they ascend to the middle world. This alarms the guards, in response to which the Great Mana dispatches Yushamin, who interrogates Hibil's identity and permits him re-entry to the World of Light, upon which he is baptised 360 times again.

See also
List of angels in theology

Dying-and-rising deity
Dehwa Hanina

References

Uthras
Hebrew Bible people in Mandaeism
Cain and Abel
Mandaean given names
Individual angels
Katabasis